Alexandru Andrei Ghiban (born 12 October 1986 in Mizil) is a Romanian water polo player. At the 2012 Summer Olympics, he competed for the Romania men's national water polo team in the men's event. He is 6 ft 5 inches tall.

References

Romanian male water polo players
1986 births
Living people
Olympic water polo players of Romania
Water polo players at the 2012 Summer Olympics
People from Mizil